Diego Fernando Latorre (born 4 August 1969) is an Argentine former professional footballer who played as a striker or as an offensive midfielder.

Career
Latorre was born in Buenos Aires. He made his professional debut for Boca Juniors on 18 October 1987 against Platense scoring his first goal at the same match. He won the 1991 Argentine league with Boca Juniors. His good performance took him to play with the Argentina national football team scoring his first goal in a Friendly match against Brazil.

In 1992, he joined Fiorentina with Gabriel Batistuta after the pair helped Argentina to win the Copa America in 1991. While Batistuta eventually became one of Fiorentina's all-time greats, Latorre only made two appearances with the club and quickly left for CD Tenerife in La Liga. He made 67 appearances 15 goals with the Spanish club. He moved to UD Salamanca in 1995, but only spent a single season there. He returned to Boca Juniors in 1996. He also played for Racing Club de Avellaneda and Rosario Central after returning from Europe. He later played in Mexico and Guatemala before retiring in 2005.

After retirement
Latorre is a sportscaster for Fox Sports Latinoamérica, and has worked alongside Juan Manuel Pons or Gustavo Cima as a football commentator for Latin América (South Cone).

Honours
Boca Juniors
Supercopa Libertadores: 1989
Recopa Sudamericana: 1990 
Argentine Primera División Torneo Apertura: 1992

Argentina
Copa América: 1991

Individual
Argentine Primera División Top-scorer: 1992

References

External links

 
 Argentina Soccer
 News

1969 births
Living people
Footballers from Buenos Aires
Association football midfielders
Association football forwards
Argentine footballers
Argentine people of Italian descent
Argentine people of Basque descent
Boca Juniors footballers
Racing Club de Avellaneda footballers
Chacarita Juniors footballers
Rosario Central footballers
Cruz Azul footballers
Dorados de Sinaloa footballers
ACF Fiorentina players
CD Tenerife players
UD Salamanca players
Comunicaciones F.C. players
Argentine Primera División players
La Liga players
Serie A players
Liga MX players
Argentina international footballers
Argentine expatriate footballers
Expatriate footballers in Italy
Expatriate footballers in Spain
Expatriate footballers in Mexico
Expatriate footballers in Guatemala
Argentine expatriate sportspeople in Italy
Argentine expatriate sportspeople in Mexico
Argentine expatriate sportspeople in Spain
1991 Copa América players
Copa América-winning players